Mason S. Maggio (born July 7, 2004) is an American professional stock car racing driver. He competes full-time in the Carolina Pro Late Model Series and part-time in the CARS Pro Late Model Tour, driving the No. 51 Ford Fusion for E33 Motorsports, and part-time in the NASCAR Xfinity Series, driving the No. 66 Ford Mustang for MBM Motorsports.

Racing career

Early career

Go-Karts: 2015-2017
Maggio began racing at around 11 to 12 years old, after he went to a rental go-kart track with his friends.

INEX: Bandoleros and Legend Cars
He began driving Bandoleros from 2018 to 2019, where he won 11 races, three championships, and ranking 3rd in the National standings. He would move up to Legend Cars in 2020, earning 8 wins and three championships.

Limited Late Models
Maggio made his Limited Late Model debut in 2021, racing full time in the Paramount Kia Big 10 Challenge for Leicht Motorsports. He earned 4 wins, 8 top 5's, 10 top 10's, and finished third in the final standings.

Pro Late Models
On November 17, 2021, Maggio announced on Twitter that he will run full-time in the Carolina Pro Late Model Series for Rick Ware Racing in 2022. He has earned 3 wins at Franklin County Speedway, Goodyear All American Speedway, and Motor Mile Speedway so far.

ARCA Menards Series

2022
Maggio would do pre-season testing at Daytona International Speedway for Jankowiak Motorsports in 2022 in an ARCA car.

NASCAR Camping World Truck Series

2022
On May 30, 2022, Reaume Brothers Racing announced that Maggio would make his NASCAR Camping World Truck Series debut piloting their No. 33 truck at World Wide Technology Raceway, he would start 33rd and finish 27th. On August 8, it was announced that Maggio will make his second start of the season at Richmond Raceway, driving the 96 truck for Peck Motorsports. After failing to qualify for the race, Josh Reaume would allow Maggio to drive his 43 truck instead.

Xfinity Series

2023 
On January 30, 2023, Maggio tested an Xfinity Series car at Charlotte Motor Speedway for MBM Motorsports. On February 24, MBM announced that Maggio will make his series debut for the team at Las Vegas Motor Speedway in March.

Motorsports career results

NASCAR
(key) (Bold – Pole position awarded by qualifying time. Italics – Pole position earned by points standings or practice time. * – Most laps led. ** – All laps led.)

Xfinity Series

Craftsman Truck Series

References

External links
 
 

Living people
NASCAR drivers
CARS Tour drivers
Racing drivers from Florida
Racing drivers from Miami
Sportspeople from Palm Beach, Florida
2004 births